Fatty aldehydes are aliphatic, long-chain aldehydes which may be mono- or polyunsaturated. The fatty aldehydes include compounds such as octanal, nonanal, decanal or dodecanal. The nomenclature is derived from the nomenclature of the alkanes, the ending -al is added to indicate the aldehyde group.

Occurrence 
Fatty aldehydes are a natural component of many natural ingredients such as the essential oils of various citrus fruits. Decanal, for example, is a component of orange peel. The pheromone cocktails of various insect pheromones contain fatty aldehydes. Fat aldehydes were also detected in the heart muscle of mammals.

Preparation 
Fatty aldehydes can be prepared by dehydrogenation of fatty alcohols on copper-zinc catalysts. By the hydroformylation of alkenes, fatty aldehydes are produced on a large industrial scale.

Use 
A large proportion of the fatty aldehydes prepared by hydroformylation is directly processed further to fatty alcohols. Many fatty aldehydes find use as a fragrance in perfume production. An example is 2-methylundecanal which is the typical odor component of Chanel No. 5. Decanal, whose sweet, flowery odor reminiscents of orange peels, is used, among other things, as a flavoring agent in the food industry and as a perfume in the perfume industry.

See also
 Fatty acid
 Fatty alcohol

References 

Fatty aldehydes
Sweet-smelling chemicals